The 1956 United States Senate election in Alabama was held on November 6, 1956. Incumbent Senator J. Lister Hill was re-elected for a fourth term in office.

On May 1, Hill won the Democratic primary over John G. Crommelin, who ran in 1950 as an independent, with 68.20% of the vote. 

Hill won the November general election without an opponent.

Democratic primary

Candidates
J. Lister Hill, incumbent Senator
John G. Crommelin, retired Rear Admiral in the United States Navy and independent candidate for Senate in 1950

Results

General election

References

1956
Alabama
United States Senate
Single-candidate elections